Moccasin Township is one of fifteen townships in Effingham County, Illinois, USA.  As of the 2010 census, its population was 484 and it contained 219 housing units.

Geography

Unincorporated towns
 Moccasin

Extinct towns
 Blue Point

Cemeteries
The township contains these three cemeteries: Moccasin, Pleasant Grove and Saint Paul Lutheran.

Demographics

School districts
 Altamont Community Unit School District 10
 Beecher City Community Unit School District 20

Political districts
 Illinois' 19th congressional district
 State House District 109
 State Senate District 55

References
 
 United States Census Bureau 2007 TIGER/Line Shapefiles
 United States National Atlas

External links
 City-Data.com
 Illinois State Archives

Townships in Effingham County, Illinois
1860 establishments in Illinois
Populated places established in 1860
Townships in Illinois